Acalolepta fasciata is a species of longhorn beetle in the family Cerambycidae. It was described by Xavier Montrouzier in 1855. It is known from Papua New Guinea, Vanuatu, Indonesia, Samoa, Australia, the Solomon Islands, Moluccas, and possibly Sulawesi. It feeds on trees such as Hevea brasiliensis, Artocarpus altilis, and Ficus watkinsiana.

References

Acalolepta
Beetles described in 1855